Quentin Laurent (born 6 October 1989) is a Belgian professional footballer who plays for Rebecq in the Belgian Division 2 as a centre-back.

Career
On 16 March 2021, Laurent signed with Rebecq in the Belgian Division 2. He moved there from Olympic Charleroi, where he had played between 2019 and 2021. Earlier, he had represented Châtelet, Tubize, and KSC Grimbergen.

Laurent made his debut for Rebecq on 28 August 2021 in a 1–0 league win over Stockay-Warfusée.

References

External links

Quentin Laurent at Footballdatabase

1989 births
Living people
Belgian footballers
Association football central defenders
A.F.C. Tubize players
Belgian Third Division players
Challenger Pro League players
R. Châtelet S.C. players
Léopold FC players
R. Olympic Charleroi Châtelet Farciennes players
R.U.S. Rebecquoise players